Malsch is a municipality in the district of Karlsruhe, in Baden-Württemberg, Germany. It is situated 15 km south of Karlsruhe, and 10 km east of Rastatt, at the eastern border of the Upper Rhine Plain.

Beside the main town, it consists of the incorporated villages Sulzbach, Waldprechtsweier and Völkersbach, the latter located higher in the Black Forest.

References

Karlsruhe (district)